Andrew Hugh Wallace (1926 – 18 January 2008) was a Scottish-American mathematician.

Biography
Andrew Hugh Wallace was born and raised in Edinburgh, Scotland. He received in 1946 an MA in mathematics from Edinburgh University and in 1949 a PhD from St. Andrews University with thesis Rational integral functions and associated linear transformations. In the 1950s he was an assistant professor of mathematics at the University of Toronto in Canada. In 1959 he became a professor at Indiana University's mathematics department, where he was also department chair. In 1965 he left Indiana to become a mathematics professor at the University of Pennsylvania, where he remained until his retirement as professor emeritus in 1986. For the academic year 1964–1965 and the first five months of 1968 he was a visiting scholar at the Institute for Advanced Study.

In addition to his work in mathematics, Andrew Wallace was an accomplished pianist, dancer, painter, and sailor.  His greatest passion during his later life was sailing.  He maintained a 35-foot craft.  After his retirement, he and a small crew sailed his boat across the Atlantic and Mediterranean to his new home in Crete.  He lived in Crete with his second wife Dimitra until he died in 2008.

Upon his death he was survived by his first wife, Angela Wallace (now Angela Kern) and three daughters: Linda Kipp, Susan George, and Corinne Summers.  He was also survived by his second wife, Dimitra Chilari and a step-daughter, Irene Chilari. His name is attached to the Lickorish-Wallace theorem.

Selected publication

Articles

Books

References

External links

1926 births
2008 deaths
20th-century American mathematicians
21st-century American mathematicians
Scottish mathematicians
Topologists
Alumni of the University of Edinburgh
Alumni of the University of St Andrews
Academic staff of the University of Toronto
Indiana University faculty
University of Pennsylvania faculty
Mathematicians at the University of Pennsylvania
Institute for Advanced Study visiting scholars
Scientists from Edinburgh
Sir Edmund Whittaker Memorial Prize winners